The 2017–18 FC Anzhi Makhachkala season was the club's third season back in the Russian Premier League, the highest tier of football in Russia, since their relegation at the end of the  2013–14 season.

Season events
On 13 August 2017, Aleksandr Grigoryan resigned from his role as manager, with Vadim Skripchenko being appointed as Anzhi's new manager the following day.

Squad

Out on loan

Anzhi-2 Makhachkala

Transfers

Summer

In:

Out:

Winter

In:

Out:

Released

Friendlies

Competitions

Russian Premier League

Results by round

Results

League table

Relegation play-offs

Russian Cup

Squad statistics

Appearances and goals

|-
|colspan="14"|Players away from the club on loan:

|-
|colspan="14"|Players who left Anzhi Makhachkala during the season:

|}

Goal scorers

Disciplinary record

References

External links
Official website
Fans' website 
A fan is a club Anji

FC Anzhi Makhachkala seasons
Anzhi Makhachkala